Sharon Helmer Poggenpohl is a design scholar and educator. She was the editor and publisher of the interdisciplinary journal Visible Language.

Education and career 
Poggenpohl obtained an MS from the Illinois Institute of Technology (IIT) in 1974, and first taught at the Rhode Island School of Design. From 1987 to 2013, she coordinated the PhD in design program of the Illinois Institute of Technology (IIT) and edited the journal Visual Language. She went on to develop an Interaction Design program at Hong Kong Polytechnic University.

Poggenpohl is known for her work to develop graduate studies in design, through the edition of anthology and the publications of essays. These include the book Design Integrations.

Notes and references 

American designers
Living people
Year of birth missing (living people)
Illinois Institute of Technology alumni
Rhode Island School of Design faculty